The Church of Central Africa Presbyterian – Harare Synod was founded in 1965 by immigrant workers from Malawi in search of employment in mining and farming areas in Zimbabwe. Ministers came from Malawi and South Africa. Worships are in English, Shona, Chewa and Ndebele. The Harare Synod is part of the Church of Central Africa Presbyterian. It also has cordial relationship with other Reformed churches.

It has 25 parishes with approximately 10,000 members in four presbyteries. The churches met every two years as a Synod.

Doctrine 
Apostles Creed
Athanasian Creed
Nicene Creed
Canons of Dort
Heidelberg Catechism

References 

Presbyterianism in Zambia
Presbyterian denominations in Africa
Christian organizations established in 1965
Protestantism in Zimbabwe
Members of the World Communion of Reformed Churches